is a Japanese manga series written by Nisio Isin and illustrated by Yūji Iwahara. It has been serialized in Shueisha's Weekly Shōnen Jump magazine since November 2022, with its chapters collected in a single tankōbon volume as of March 2023.

Plot summary
The plot takes place in the eponymous Cipher Academy, a former  all girls' military academy focused on study of cryptography, and focuses on Iroha Irohazaka, the sole boy in his class. While dealing with a spartan homework puzzle on his first day in class, Iroha comes across Kogoe Horagatoge, a student from a different class on the run from Kyora Toshusai, a fellow student of Iroha's and the heiress to a weapons manufacturer. After helping hide her, Kogoe gifts Iroha with a pair of glasses embedded with technology that allows him to see the "hints" to codes that his fellow classmates use to seed control. After winning a cipher-based battle against Kyora, Iroha is thrown into a conspiracy involving 50 billion morg hidden in the academy - a stash of cryptocurrency so valuable that it could end half the wars in the world... or double them.

Publication
Written by Nisio Isin and illustrated by Yūji Iwahara, the series began serialization in Shueisha's Weekly Shōnen Jump magazine on November 21, 2022. A voice comic featuring Rina Satō, Ayane Sakura, and Saori Ōnishi was released on YouTube. Shueisha released the first tankōbon volume on March 3, 2023.

Viz Media and Manga Plus are publishing the series in English. However, the series' English translator Kumar Sivasubramanian announced he would stop translating the series following the release of the thirteenth chapter; he also linked to an article by Screen Rant, which described the series as "impossible to translate". He was replaced by a new translator.

Volume list

Reception
Carlyle Edmundson of Screen Rant praised the use of purposeful censorship to illustrate points about contemporary Japan.

References

Further reading

External links
  
 

Nisio Isin
Shōnen manga
Shueisha manga
Viz Media manga